Survival is a scholarly international studies journal of the International Institute for Strategic Studies, the British international affairs research institute. It is published by Taylor & Francis and has six issues a year. It was established in 1959 and the editor is Dana Allin (International Institute for Strategic Studies).

Abstracting and indexing 
The journal is abstracted and indexed in:
 Columbia International Affairs Online
 CSA Worldwide Political Science Abstracts
 Current Contents/Social & Behavioural Sciences
 Military Policy Research
 Social Sciences Citation Index 
 PAIS International
 Periodicals Contents Index
 World Affairs Online

According to the Journal Citation Reports, the journal has a 2015 impact factor of 0.474, ranking it 121st out of 163 journals in the category "Political Science" and 68th out of 86 in the category "International Relations".

See also
List of international relations journals

References

External links
 

Bimonthly journals
International relations journals
Publications established in 1959
Taylor & Francis academic journals